The 1997 NCAA Division I men's basketball tournament involved 64 schools playing in single-elimination play to determine the national champion of men's NCAA Division I college basketball. It began on March 13, 1997, and ended with the championship game on March 31 in Indianapolis, Indiana at the RCA Dome. A total of 63 games were played.

The Final Four consisted of Kentucky, who entered the tournament as the defending national champions, Minnesota, making their first Final Four appearance, Arizona, making their third Final Four appearance and first since 1994, and North Carolina, making their thirteenth Final Four appearance and first since 1995.

In the national championship game, Arizona defeated Kentucky in overtime 84–79 to win their first national championship. For the second time in the last three seasons, the defending national champions reached the final game and lost.

Miles Simon of Arizona was named the tournament's Most Outstanding Player.

Several years later, Minnesota was stripped of its Final Four appearance following the discovery of NCAA academic rule violations. In addition, the Gophers were stripped of their Big Ten title they had also won.

Arizona also became the only school since the introduction of the 64-team bracket in 1985, to defeat three number 1 seeds in the tournament, having upset overall number one seed Kansas in addition to their two Final Four victories.

The tournament also saw the third victory by a #15 seed over a #2 seed, as Coppin State defeated South Carolina in their first round matchup. In addition, a #14 seed advanced to the Sweet Sixteen for only the second time, as Southeast Region #14 seed Chattanooga defeated both Georgia and Illinois.

The tournament marked the end of the career of North Carolina coach Dean Smith. Smith, whose team lost in the national semifinals, retired just prior to the beginning of the 1997–98 season.

Schedule and venues

The following are the sites that were selected to host each round of the 1997 tournament:

First and Second Rounds
March 13 and 15
East Region
 Lawrence Joel Veterans Memorial Coliseum, Winston-Salem, North Carolina (Host: Wake Forest University)
Midwest Region
 The Palace of Auburn Hills, Auburn Hills, Michigan (Host: Mid-American Conference)
Southeast Region
 Memphis Pyramid, Memphis, Tennessee (Host: University of Memphis)
West Region
 Jon M. Huntsman Center, Salt Lake City, Utah (Host: University of Utah)
March 14 and 16
East Region
 Pittsburgh Civic Arena, Pittsburgh, Pennsylvania (Host: Duquesne University)
Midwest Region
 Kemper Arena, Kansas City, Missouri (Host: University of Kansas)
Southeast Region
 Charlotte Coliseum, Charlotte, North Carolina (Host: Davidson College)
West Region
 McKale Center, Tucson, Arizona (Host: University of Arizona)

Regional semifinals and finals (Sweet Sixteen and Elite Eight)
March 20 and 22
Midwest Regional, Alamodome, San Antonio, Texas (Host: University of Texas at San Antonio)
West Regional, San Jose Arena, San Jose, California (Host: San Jose State University)
March 21 and 23
East Regional, Carrier Dome, Syracuse, New York (Host: Syracuse University)
Southeast Regional, BJCC Coliseum, Birmingham, Alabama (Host: Southeastern Conference)

National semifinals and championship (Final Four and championship)
March 29 and 31
RCA Dome, Indianapolis, Indiana (Hosts: Butler University, Midwestern Collegiate Conference)

The Final Four returned to Indianapolis for the third time, and to the RCA Dome for the second time in seven years. There were three new host cities and four new arenas in the 1997 tournament. For the first time since 1953, the tournament returned to the southern San Francisco Bay area, this time at the San Jose Arena in San Jose. The tournament also saw the first games held at the Alamodome and in San Antonio, the eighth city in Texas to host games; only California has hosted in more cities. The city of Pittsburgh hosted for the first time, at the Civic Arena, the first games played outside Philadelphia within the state of Pennsylvania. Finally, the Palace of Auburn Hills, Detroit's major indoor basketball arena from 1988 to 2017, hosted games for the first time in 1997. All thirteen venues in the tournament have hosted games since this one. Any future tournament games to be held in Detroit would be played at Ford Field or Little Caesars Arena.

Teams

Bids by conference

Bracket
* – Denotes overtime period

East Regional - Syracuse, New York

Southeast Regional - Birmingham, Alabama

Midwest Regional - San Antonio, Texas

West Regional - San Jose, California

Final Four – Indianapolis, Indiana

* – Denotes overtime period

Announcers
Jim Nantz and Billy Packer – First & Second Round at Tucson, Arizona; Southeast Regional at Birmingham, Alabama; Final Four at Indianapolis, Indiana
Sean McDonough and Bill Raftery – First & Second Round at Winston-Salem, North Carolina; West Regional at San Jose, California
Tim Ryan and Al McGuire – First & Second Round at Memphis, Tennessee; Midwest Regional at San Antonio, Texas
Gus Johnson and Quinn Buckner – First & Second Round at Auburn Hills, Michigan; East Regional at Syracuse, New York
Tim Brando and George Raveling – First & Second Round at Charlotte, North Carolina
Mike Gorman and Jon Sundvold – First & Second Round at Pittsburgh, Pennsylvania
Ted Robinson and Derrek Dickey – First & Second Round at Kansas City, Missouri
Gary Thorne and Dan Bonner – First & Second Round at Salt Lake City, Utah

See also
 1997 NCAA Division II men's basketball tournament
 1997 NCAA Division III men's basketball tournament
 1997 NCAA Division I women's basketball tournament
 1997 NCAA Division II women's basketball tournament
 1997 NCAA Division III women's basketball tournament
 1997 National Invitation Tournament
 1997 NAIA Division I men's basketball tournament
 1997 NAIA Division II men's basketball tournament
 1997 NAIA Division I women's basketball tournament
 1997 NAIA Division II women's basketball tournament

References

NCAA Division I men's basketball tournament
Ncaa
NCAA
NCAA Men's Division I Basketball Championship
NCAA Men's Division I Basketball Championship
NCAA Division I men's basketball tournament